Ready Boy & Girls? is a limited edition 10" vinyl by the band Tears for Fears, released in April 2014. The release contains three cover songs that were originally recorded by Animal Collective ("My Girls"), Arcade Fire ("Ready to Start") and Hot Chip ("And I Was a Boy from School"), hence the amalgamated title of the release. To begin work on their seventh album, Tears for Fears recorded the tracks in 2013.

Though the three tracks were not intended to be released as official singles (each was made available to stream on the band's SoundCloud page), the band were prompted to release them together as a limited edition 10" vinyl for 2014 Record Store Day. The EP was Tears For Fears' first new release in ten years, following their 2004 comeback album Everybody Loves a Happy Ending.

Track listings
Digital download
 "My Girls" (Animal Collective cover) – 4:36
 "Ready to Start" (Arcade Fire cover) – 3:24
 "And I Was a Boy from School" (Hot Chip cover) – 4:03

External links
https://www.rollingstone.com/music/news/tears-for-fears-cover-arcade-fire-s-ready-to-start-20130820
https://www.stereogum.com/1604431/tears-for-fears-my-girls-animal-collective-cover/mp3s/?amp=1
https://www.stereogum.com/1543242/tears-for-fears-boy-from-school-hot-chip-cover/mp3s/?amp=1

2014 EPs
Tears for Fears albums
Record Store Day releases